2007/08 UEFA Futsal Cup was the top European cup of Futsal, supported by UEFA, started on 11 August 2007 with match day 1 of Preliminary Round. The cup was finished on 27 April 2008 after the Final Four held in Krylatskoye Sports Palace in Moscow, Russia.

Participants

Clubs eliminated in Preliminary Round
Teams are listed alphabetical based on UEFA Official web page:

  
 Ararat Nicosia
 DE Hommel
 Granvalira FC Encamp
 Fair City Santos
 FC Anzhi Tallinn
 FK Kauguri
 FV Eppelborn
 MNK Kaskada Gračanica
 Issy Futsal
 Jeepers
 KS Ali Demi
 FK Nafta Mažeikiai
 Shamrock Rovers
 Stella Rosa Vienna
 Uni Futsal Team Bulle
 London White Bear FC

Clubs eliminated in Main Round

  
 Araz Naxçivan
 Athina 90
 FC Camelot Chisinau
 Futsal Club Gödöllö
 Iberia Tbilisi
 Ilves FS Tampere
 KMN Puntar
 Mapid FUT
 MFC Varna
 KMF Alfa Parf Skopje
 Skövde AIK
 Polytechnic Yerevan

Elite Round

Group A

 Chorzów, 15–18 October 2007

Group B

 Padova, 18–21 October 2007

Group C

 Chrudim, 15–18 October 2007

Group D

 Ekaterinburg, 14–17 October 2007

Final four
Note: Final Four matches were broadcast across Europe by Eurosport.

 Moscow, 25–27 April 2008

Semifinals

Final 3rd and 4th

Final

References

External links
 Official UEFA Futsal Cup website

UEFA Futsal Champions League
Cup